Cecelia Lee Fung-Sing (born May 6, 1933) is a Chinese actress and Cantonese opera singer from Hong Kong. Lee is known for cross-dressed in male role in Cantonese opera films. Lee is credited with over 55 films.

Early life 
On May 6, 1933, Lee was born.

Education 
For Cantonese opera, Lee was mentored by Lee Bo-lun. Lee trained in martial arts from masters Simon Yuen Siu-tin, Qi Yukun, Han Yingjie and Kwan Ching-leung. Lee trained in vocal from Wong To and Lau Siu-wing.

Career 
In 1953, Lee became an actress in Hong Kong films. Lee first appeared as Sixth Aunt in The Valiant Dog, a 1953 Drama film directed by Wong Toi. Her Xue Baochai, credited as Lee Heung-Ying, in two 1954 films the Grand View Garden (Part 1 and Part 2) when she was opposite Yim Fun Fong, the Lin Daiyu, in contemporary settings instead of usual opera costumes. Lee first appeared in Cantonese opera related film in An Actor's Struggle with Yam Kim-fai, a 1955 Cantonese opera film directed by Fung Chi-Kong. In 1962, Lee also became a producer for 8 Roaming Heroines (Part 1 and Part 2). Lee is known for appearing in male role in some Cantonese opera films. Lee cross-dressed and appeared as King Yan of Song in Trouble in the Palace (aka Sister Yeung), a 1963 Cantonese opera film directed by Chan Cheuk-Sang. In this film, Lee also performed leg-swirling somersault. Lee cross-dressed and appeared as Jin general Fu Siu-Fung in The Hero's Tears (aka Operation Woods), a 1964 Cantonese opera film directed by Chan Cheuk-Sang. Lee also cross-dressed and appeared as Prince Kam Lun in The Ambitious Prince, a 1965 Cantonese opera film directed by Wong Fung. In 1966. Lee co-founded a Cantonese opera troupe. In Lee's last Hong Kong film, she cross-dressed and appeared as king of Wei, Cho Sai-cheong, in The Plot (aka Teaching the Son to Slay the Emperor, Revenge of the Prince), a 1967 Historical Drama film directed by Wong Hok-Sing. In 1996, Lee founded Lee Yuen Chinese Opera in Australia. In Australia. Lee appeared in Floating Life, a 1996 film directed by Clara Law Cheuk-Yiu. Lee is credited with over 55 films.

Filmography

Films 
This is a partial list of films.
 1953 The Valiant Dog – Sixth Aunt 
 1955 An Actor's Struggle 
 1961 Leung Hung Yuk's Victory at Wong Tin Tong 
 1962 8 Roaming Heroines (Part 1 and Part 2) (aka Eight Roaming Heroines, Eight Errant Ladies) – also as Producer. 
 1963 The Fake Lover (aka A Funny Match) – Young man. 
 1963 Trouble in the Palace (aka Sister Yeung) – King Yan of Song 
 1964 The Hero's Tears (aka Operation Woods) – Fu Siu-Fung, a Jin general 
 1964 The 9 Phoenixes of the City (aka Nine Phoenixes of Hong Kong, The Nine Ladies of Fragrant City) – Bullying mobster (male role).
 1965 The Ambitious Prince – Prince Kam Lun 
 1967 The Plot (aka Teaching the Son to Slay the Emperor, Revenge of the Prince) – Cho Sai-cheong, king of Wei 
 1996 Floating Life – Mrs. Chan. Won Golden Horse Award for Best Supporting Actress.

Awards 
 1996 Golden Horse Awards – Best Supporting Actress for Floating Life.

Personal life 
Lee's husband is Fung Chi-Kong, a film director. In 1991, Lee moved to Sydney, Australia.

References

External links 
 Heung-Sing Lee at douban.com (in Chinese)
 Fung-Sing Lee at imdb.com
 Lee Heung Ying at hkcinemagic.com

1933 births
Hong Kong Cantonese opera actresses
Hong Kong film actresses
Living people